is a district located in northwestern Hiroshima Prefecture, Japan.

As of 2003, the district has an estimated population of 29,978 and a density of 30.34 persons per km2. The total area is 988.11 km2.

Towns and villages 
Akiōta: founded on October 1, 2004 from the merger of the towns of Kake and Togouchi, and the village of Tsutsuga
Kitahiroshima: founded on February 1, 2005 from the merger of the towns of Chiyoda, Geihoku, Ōasa and Toyohira

Districts in Hiroshima Prefecture